The Somali wheatear (Oenanthe phillipsi) is a species of bird in the family Muscicapidae. It is found in northeast Ethiopia and northeast Somalia.

Its natural habitats are subtropical or tropical dry shrubland and subtropical or tropical dry lowland grassland.

References

Somali wheatear
Birds of the Horn of Africa
Somali wheatear
Taxonomy articles created by Polbot